Siliguri Metropolitan Police, established in 2012, is a city police force with primary responsibilities in law enforcement and investigation within the certain urban parts of Siliguri, West Bengal. The Commissionerate is part of the West Bengal Police, and is under the administrative control of Home Ministry of West Bengal. It was formed after bifurcation of the Darjeeling Police District, and has eight police stations under its jurisdiction. Gaurav Sharma, IPS (a DIGP rank officer) has taken over charge of the Commissioner of Police Silliguri Police Commissionerate .

Police stations
1. Bagdogra PS
2. Bhaktinagar PS
3. Matigara PS
4. Pradhannagar PS
5. Siliguri PS
6. New Jalpaiguri PS
7. Cyber Crime PS Siliguri
8. Women Police Station PS

See also
 Barrackpore Police Commissionerate
 Bidhannagar Police Commissionerate
 Chandannagar Police Commissionerate
 Kolkata Police
 West Bengal Police

External links
 Official website

References 

Metropolitan law enforcement agencies of India
Siliguri
West Bengal Police
Gorkhaland
Police Commissionerate in West Bengal
2012 establishments in West Bengal
Government agencies established in 2012